Danielle Steel's A Perfect Stranger, also known as A Perfect Stranger (just like the name of the romance novel by Danielle Steel from which the film takes origin) is a 1994 American romantic-drama television film directed by Michael Miller, whose most important element is the love triangle which characterizes it. The film is set in San Francisco, California, and was released in the United States in 1994 where it aired on NBC.

Plot
A lawyer falls in love with a woman who's married to a dying millionaire and results in a love triangle.

Cast
 Robert Urich – Alex Hale
 Stacy Haiduk – Raphaella Phillips
 Darren McGavin – John Henry Phillips
 Susan Sullivan – Kaye
 Holly Marie Combs – Amanda Hale
 Marion Ross – Charlotte Brandon
 Ron Gabriel – Fred
 Tamara Gorski – Sarah
 George R. Robertson – Richard Lance
 Patricia Brown – Mary
 Denise McLeod – Flight Attendant
 Margaret Ozols – German Housekeeper
 Adrian Truss – Publisher
 Natalie Gray – Flight Attendant (uncredited)
 Michal Page – Woman in airport (uncredited)

References

External links
 

1994 films
Films set in California
1994 romantic drama films
American romantic drama films
American drama television films
Films directed by Michael Miller (director)
1990s English-language films
1990s American films